Ricardo Preve (born October 24, 1957, in Buenos Aires) is an Argentine filmmaker, photographer, and activist. Preve began his film career in the early 2000s as an associate producer on some documentaries. Since then, he has worked as a director, producer or scriptwriter in nearly thirty productions for film and television, including The Patagonian Bones (2015) and Coming Home (2019), both of which have won awards and recognition at international festivals. Preve is the owner of the audiovisual production companies Ricardo Preve Films LLC and Esto del Cine SRL.

Early life 
Preve was born in Buenos Aires, Argentina, in 1957. After studying in his native country, in Italy and in the United States, he obtained the degrees of Agricultural Engineer and Master in Forestry at the Virginia Polytechnic Institute and State University.

He left Argentina in 1976 by crewing a sailboat from Argentina to South Africa. During the journey, the novice Argentine crew and the inexperienced English speaking boat owner ran out of food off the coast of Africa. They subsisted on cooking grease and vitamin pills until they were towed to safety. The experiences of the young Argentinians were reported in sailing magazines in their home country.

After working for twenty years as manager of agroforestry companies, Preve began his career in the film industry in 2001, joining as associate producer in the feature film Adiós, querida Luna, released in 2005 and directed by Fernando Spiner.

Career

2000s
In 2003, Preve was the co-producer of the musical documentary Tango, A Strange Turn, about the new generation of tango artists in Argentina. The documentary was directed by Mercedes García Guevara and premiered in Argentina in 2005. In that same year he organized the Argentine Film Festival in conjunction with the Foundation for the Humanities and the University of Virginia. The event took place in April. One year later, Preve registered production credits in the documentary Mondovino. The film, recorded with a manual digital camera in locations in Italy, France, the United States and Argentina, was part of the Official Selection of the 2004 Cannes Film Festival.

His debut as a director came in 2005 with Chagas: A Hidden Affliction, a documentary that deals with the subject of Chagas disease and its spread. The film, which was supported by the humanitarian organization Doctors without Borders, was filmed in Argentine provinces like Santiago del Estero, Salta and Jujuy, and featured testimonies from medical specialists, researchers and people suffering from the disease. During 2006 Preve wrote, directed and produced the short documentary Esperanza Means Hope and worked as executive producer of the breast cancer based documentary Summer Running: The Race to Cure Breast Cancer, directed by American filmmaker Scott Mactavish and starring actress Sissy Spacek.

Preve wrote and directed two short fiction films: La noche antes in 2006 and La notte prima in 2007. The films, which tell the story of the last night in the life of Martín Miguel de Güemes (a military and political figure who played a key role in Argentina's War of Independence) and Anita Garibaldi (known as "the heroine of the two worlds") respectively, won recognition at film events in Argentina and internationally. In 2008, the filmmaker collaborated with National Geographic in the production of the TV show Darwin's Secret Notebooks, providing logistics and production services in Argentina, Uruguay and Ecuador. The series was broadcast by the channel on February 10, 2009. His partnership with the network continued, playing roles of production and research in the television documentaries Child Mummy Sacrifice (about the preserved bodies of three Inca children found in the province of Salta), Ghosts of Machu Picchu (broadcast on PBS), Twins (about the experiments carried out by Josef Mengele) and Are We There Yet?: World Adventure (children's series broadcast by National Geographic Kids in Brazil). Child Mummy Sacrifice won an Emmy nomination in the category of "Best Lighting and Scenic Design".

On December 4, 2009, his first fiction feature film, José Ignacio was released. The film, co-produced between Uruguay and Argentina, was part of the official selection of the Punta del Este International Film Festival, as well as the Virginia Film Festival, the Levante Film Festival and the Strasbourg International Film Festival.

2010s
In 2011 Preve wrote the script for the Argentine environmental series Diary of a Solar Car and began work on the first season of the Uruguayan TV fiction series Garzón, a modern adaptation of Cervantes' Don Quixote, filmed in a small town in Uruguay, which Preve directed and wrote. A year later, he was again interested in Chagas disease, producing and directing the television special Chagas: A Silent Killer. Broadcast by Al Jazeera in April 2013, this production featured renowned soccer player Lionel Messi, who dedicated a few words to the project through a video that was shown at an event in Cochambamba, Bolivia.

In 2013, the filmmaker became involved as the director and co-scriptwriter in the TV series El francés, filmed in Punta del Este, Uruguay, and released in late 2014 in that country. Also in 2014, Preve produced and directed a series of videos filmed in Kenya in support of Drugs for Neglected Diseases Initiative. A year later, he produced, directed and wrote a new documentary, entitled The Patagonian Bones, about the discovery of the remains of the first Welsh woman who died in Patagonia in 1865. The film was broadcast on Argentine public television. The Patagonian Bones was successful at international festivals, winning awards and nominations at events like Accolade Global Film Competition in California, Nuevas Miradas en la Televisión Argentina, Latitude Film Awards, London International Motion Picture Awards and North European International Film Festival, among others.

In 2016 Preve got involved in a new project, the documentary Looking for Marie Anne, based on the search for the remains of Marie Anne Erize, a French-Argentine model who belonged to the Montoneros urban guerrilla and who mysteriously disappeared in October 1976. After five years of work, in 2018 Preve wrote, directed and produced a new feature film, Coming Home, which recounts the events of the repatriation of the remains of Carlo Acefalo, an Italian sailor who died during World War II, from a desert island in the Red Sea to his native country. Between 2018 and 2019, Coming Home won numerous awards at film events in Uruguay, United Kingdom, Spain and United States.

2020s 
In 2021, Preve produced and directed From Sudan to Argentina in the United States, Argentina and Sudan. The feature documentary tells the story of the Argentine Historian and Egyptologist Abraham Rosenvasser, as leader of an UNESCO sponsored French-Argentine archeological mission in 1961-1963. The mission involved saving the treasures of the temple of Aksha in northern Sudan, before they were destroyed by the waters of the Aswan dam in Egypt, which was being built at that time. The film was shown in various international film festivals, and received awards and special mentions. The theatrical release was in Buenos Aires, Argentina, on November 3, 2022.

A Grayling Never Dies is the next project by Preve. The film, in which he will work as director, producer and screenwriter, is based on the adventures of the English outlaw Helen Greenhill in Patagonia in the late 19th and early 20th centuries. The script for A Grayling Never Dies has won international awards at events in Europe and the United States.

Activism
Preve has made a name for himself as a Chagas activist, raising awareness about the deadly disease in coordination with the Drugs for Neglected Diseases Initiative (DNDi) organization.

He made his debut as a professional photographer in 2010, donating a portion of the proceeds from his first photo exhibit about the African goddess "Iemanja" to the Doctors Without Borders organization in light of the recent catastrophic earthquake in Haiti. Later his photographs were gathered by the UNESCO for the exhibit named "Afrodescendants / Prints and Identities", and then exhibited in Brazil, Uruguay and Argentina.

Filmography

Awards and nominations

Honors 
 Gold Medal of Merit of the Italian Navy

«Outstanding director of extraordinary professionalism and passion always dedicated to environmental and historical themes» — March 3, 2020.

References

External links 
 Official site Ricardo Preve photos
 Official site de Ricardo Preve films
  

Argentine health activists
Argentine film directors
People from Buenos Aires
Living people
1957 births